"" ("Let Us Walk Treading the Paths of Our Immense Happiness"), sometimes written with  ("the Path")) is the national anthem of Equatorial Guinea.

History
The anthem was written by musician and writer Atanasio Ndongo Miyone. The lyrics were influenced by the end of Equatorial Guinea's colonisation, with anti-colonisation being a main theme. The music was composed by Ramiro Sánchez López, who was a Spanish lieutenant and the deputy director of music at the army headquarters located in Madrid. He received a prize of 25,000 pesetas for composing the music.

The anthem was first performed on Equatorial Guinea's independence day, 12 October 1968.

On 18 June 2021, the General Director of Sports of Equatorial Guinea, Rodolfo Bodipo Diaz, announced that it was now mandatory to play the national anthem before all sporting events. The decision was made to "encourage and promote national pride and patriotic spirit from the base", referring to the youth.

Lyrics

Spanish original

Translations

See also
 Atanasio Ndongo Miyone
 Music of Equatorial Guinea

Notes

References

External links

National symbols of Equatorial Guinea
Equatoguinean music
African anthems
Spanish-language songs
National anthem compositions in A major